William H. Jordan was a Republcian politician from California, who served in the California State Assembly from the 55th district. He later served as Speaker of the Assembly in 1887. He is the uncle of California Secretary of State Frank M. Jordan. He died in Toledo, Ohio.

References 

1849 births
1939 deaths
Speakers of the California State Assembly